Frew Donald McMillan (born 20 May 1942) is a former professional male tennis player from South Africa who won five grand slam doubles titles including three Wimbledons with Bob Hewitt. All together, he won 63 doubles titles, surpassed only by the Bryan brothers, Daniel Nestor, Mark Woodforde, Todd Woodbridge, John McEnroe and Tom Okker. He was also ranked No.1 in Doubles on the ATP Computer for a significant period from 1977 to 1979 when he was aged 37.

Biography 
McMillan was born in Springs, South Africa.  Aside from his considerable success as a doubles player, he had a singles career with good results mostly in South Africa.

He played in 38 Grand Slam singles events with a 28 to 38 win–loss record, first playing in 1961 at Wimbledon and last at the first US Open at Flushing Meadows in 1978. His best results in both came at the US Open reaching the quarter finals in 1972 and the last 16 in 1976. Arguably his greatest result was reaching the final of the 1970 South African Open held at Ellis Park. He beat a raging Pancho Gonzales in the semi-final before losing to world no.1 Rod Laver in four sets in the final. At the time, the South African, Italian and German Opens were rated the top three tournaments beneath the Grand Slams. As late as 1979 McMillan reached the quarter-finals of the Fischer Open in Vienna.

McMillan continued to play the tour for many years. In doubles, he played his last Wimbledon with Bob Hewitt in 1979 reaching the semi-finals. They made a last appearance together in the main draw at Flushing Meadows in 1980 reaching the quarter-finals with a nostalgic victory over fellow veteran Americans Clark Graebner and Charlie Pasarell. McMillan won his last tour title at the 1982 South African Open with Brian Gottfried.

McMillan played for many years on the seniors tours and was runner-up at the inaugural "Wimbledon over 35's" to John Newcombe in 1982 after good wins against Tony Roche, Mark Cox and Ismail El Shafei. In 1988 he and Hewitt, older by 20 years between them, beat the Gullikson twins Tim and Tom in the 35's doubles final at Wimbledon.

The most notable aspect of his game was that he had both a two-handed backhand and forehand, which increased his power while restricting his mobility.  In the 1967 Wimbledon, he and Hewitt did not lose a set, and McMillan did not once lose a service game.

McMillan was inducted into the International Tennis Hall of Fame in Newport, Rhode Island, in 1992. He now works as a tennis commentator for Eurosport and on BBC Radio 5.

Grand Prix Championship Series singles finals

Runner-up (1)

Career titles

Singles (2 titles)

Doubles (63 titles)

Grand Slam doubles finals

Doubles (5 wins)

Mixed doubles (5 wins, 6 losses)

References

External links
 
 
 
 

1942 births
Living people
People from Springs, Gauteng
South African male tennis players
South African people of Scottish descent
Tennis commentators
International Tennis Hall of Fame inductees
Grand Slam (tennis) champions in mixed doubles
Grand Slam (tennis) champions in men's doubles
Tennis people from Bristol
French Open champions
Wimbledon champions
US Open (tennis) champions
Sportspeople from Gauteng
White South African people
ATP number 1 ranked doubles tennis players